The Tumbuka language is a Bantu language which is spoken in Malawi, Zambia, and Tanzania. Tumbuka belongs to the same language group (Guthrie Zone N) as Chewa and Sena.

The World Almanac (1998) estimates that there are approximately 2,000,000 (1998 est.) Tumbuka speakers, though other sources estimate a much smaller number. The majority of Tumbuka speakers are said to live in Malawi. Tumbuka is the most widely spoken of the languages of Northern Malawi, especially in the Rumphi, Mzuzu, and Mzimba districts.

There are substantial differences between the form of Tumbuka spoken in urban areas of Malawi (which borrows some words from Swahili and Chewa) and the "village" or "deep" Tumbuka spoken in villages. The Rumphi variant is often regarded as the most "linguistically pure", and is sometimes called "real Tumbuka". The Mzimba dialect has been strongly influenced by Zulu (chiNgoni), even so far as to have clicks in words like   "urinate", which do not occur in other dialects.

Throughout the history of Malawi, Tumbuka and Chewa have at one time or another been the primary dominant language used by government officials. However, the Tumbuka language suffered a lot  during the rule of President Hastings Kamuzu Banda, since in 1968 as a result of his one-nation, one-language policy it lost its status as an official language in Malawi. As a result, Tumbuka was removed from the school curriculum, the national radio, and the print media. With the advent of multi-party democracy in 1994, Tumbuka programmes were started again on the radio, but the number of books and other publications in Tumbuka remains low.

Orthography

Two systems of writing Tumbuka are in use: the traditional spelling (used for example in the Chitumbuka version of Wikipedia and in the newspaper ), in which words such as  'people' and  'year' are written with 'b' and 'ch', and the new official spelling (used for example in the Citumbuka dictionary published online by the Centre for Language Studies and in the online Bible), in which the same words are written with 'ŵ' and 'c', e.g. ŵanthu and caka. (The sound 'ŵ' is a closely rounded [w] pronounced with the tongue in the close-i position.) There is some uncertainty over where to write 'r' and where 'l', e.g. (In fact [l] and [r] are allophones of the same phoneme.)

Phonology

Vowels

Consonants 
Tumbuka consonants are also similar to those of the neighbouring Chewa, but with certain differences. Tumbuka  sometimes corresponds to Chewa , for example Chewa  'to be ill' = Tumbuka , Chewa  'to eat' = Tumbuka . The pronunciation of "sk" and "zg" varies according to dialect.

Tumbuka consonants are frequently either palatalised (i.e. followed by /y/) or rounded (i.e. followed by /w/.) Some of them can also be preceded by a homorganic nasal (/n/, /ng'/ or /m/). The possible consonant combinations are shown in the table below:

Tone
One of the main differences between Chewa and Tumbuka is that Chewa is a tonal language, whereas in Tumbuka there are no distinctions of tone between one word and another.

Tumbuka has a tonal accent but in a very limited way, in that every word, spoken in isolation, has the same falling tone on the penultimate syllable (which also coincides with stress). It is therefore not possible in Tumbuka to contrast two different words or two different tenses tonally, as it is in Chichewa and other Bantu languages. However, this penultimate falling tone occurs not on every word, but only on the last word of a phonological phrase; e.g. in the following sentence, only the second word has a tone, the first being toneless:
 'we are cooking porridge'

A greater variety of tonal patterns is found in the ideophones (expressive words) of Tumbuka; for example Low ( 'disintegrating into small pieces'), High ( 'swooping low (of birds)'), High-Low ( 'sound of thing bursting'), and Low-High ( 'sudden disappearance'), etc.

Intonational tones are also used in Tumbuka; for example, in yes-no questions there is often a High-Low fall on the final syllable of the question:
 'are you also weeding the maize?'

There does not seem to be any consistent, direct correlation between tone in Tumbuka and focus.

Nouns

Noun classes
As is usual with Bantu languages, Tumbuka nouns are grouped into different noun classes according to their singular and plural prefixes. Each class of noun has its own adjective, pronoun, and verb agreements, known as 'concords'. Where the agreements disagree with the prefix, the agreements take precedence in deciding the class of noun. For example, the noun  'possessions', despite having the prefix ka-, is placed in class 1, since one says  'these possessions' using the class 1 demonstrative . Malawians themselves (e.g. in the University of Malawi's Citumbuka dictionary) refer to the noun classes by traditional names such as "Mu-Ŵa-"; Bantu specialists, however, refer to the classes by numbers (1/2 etc.) corresponding to the noun-classes of other Bantu languages. Occasionally nouns do not correspond to the classes below, e.g.  'chief' (class 9) irregularly has a plural mafumu in class 6.

Class 1/2 (Mu-Ŵa-)

Some nouns in this class lack the prefix Mu-:
 pl.  = person
 pl.  = foreigner, white man
 pl.  = child
 pl.  = donkey
 pl.  = maternal uncle
 (no pl.) = goods, possessions

Class 3/4 (Mu-Mi-)
 pl.  = head
 pl.  = fig-tree
 pl.  = life
 pl.  = heart

Class 5/6 (Li-Ma-)
 pl.  = breast
 pl.  = government, district
 pl.  = bottle
 pl.  = tribe, nation
 pl.  = eye
 (no singular) = water
 pl.  = hill
 pl.  = problem, trouble
 pl.  = hand

Class 7/8 (Ci-Vi-)
 pl.  = year
 pl.  = country, land
 pl.  = farm animal
 pl.  = drunkard
 pl.  = whip

Class 9/10 (Yi-Zi-)
 pl.  = plate
 pl.  = money
 pl.  = brick
 pl.  = chicken
 pl.  = fish

Class 11 (Lu-)

Some speakers treat words in this class as if they were in class 5/6.
 = side
 = fame
 = tongue

Class 12/13 (Ka-Tu-)
 pl.  = small thing
 pl.  = baby
 pl.  = bird
 (no singular) = sleep

Class 14/6 (U-Ma-)

These nouns are frequently abstract and have no plural.
 = night
 = farming
 pl.  = bridge
 pl.  = bow

Class 15 (Ku-) Infinitive
 = to buy, buying
 = to steal, stealing

Classes 16, 17, 18 (Pa-, Ku-, Mu-) Locative
 = underneath
 = in front, before
 = inside

Concords
Verbs, adjectives, numbers, possessives, and pronouns in Tumbuka have to agree with the noun referred to. This is done by means of prefixes, infixes, or suffixes called 'concords' which differ according to the class of noun. Class 1 has the greatest variety of concords, differing for pronouns, subject prefix, object infix, numbers, adjectives, and possessives:
 = this child
 = one child
 = that child
 = the whole child
 = every child
 = the child saw him
 = the small child
 = Khumbo's child
 = my child
 = the child has seen

Other noun classes have a smaller variety of concords, as can be seen from the table below:

Sample phrases and text 
The following is a list of phrases that can be used when one visits a region whose primary language is Tumbuka:

Verbs

Subject prefix
All verbs must have a subject prefix, which agrees with the subject noun. For example, the word  'hunter' is class 7, so if it is subject, the verb has the prefix ci-:
 = 'the hunter killed a lion'

It is also possible for the subject to be a locative noun (classes 16, 17, 18), in which case the verb has a locative prefix:
 = 'on the mat there sat down a child'

The locative prefix ku- (class 17) is also used impersonally when discussing the weather:
 = 'it's cold these days'

When the subject is a personal pronoun, the subject prefixes are as follows (the pronoun itself may be omitted, but not the subject prefix):
 = 'I bought' (nkha- stands for ni-ka-)
 = 'you bought' (informal, singular)
 = 'he, she bought'
 = 'we bought'
 = 'you bought' (plural or respectful)
 = 'they bought', 'he/she bought' (plural or respectful)

'we have bought'.

In Karonga dialect, in the 3rd person singular a- is found instead of wa-, and the 3rd plural is wa- instead of ŵa-, except in the perfect tense, when wa- and ŵa- are used.

Object-marker
To indicate the object, an infix can be added to the verb immediately before the verb root. Generally speaking, the object-marker is optional:
 = 'Pokani has bought a car' (class 9)
 = 'Changa carried the luggage' (class 1)

The object-marker agrees with the class of the object, as shown on the table of concords above.

The object-marker can also be a locative (classes 16, 17, or 18):
 = 'Kondwani has climbed on top of the house'

The locative markers for personal pronouns are as follows:
 = 'he has seen me'
 = 'he has seen you'
 = 'he has seen him/her'
 = 'he has seen us'
 = 'he has seen you' (plural or respectful)
 = 'he has seen them'

Tenses
Tenses in Tumbuka are made partly by adding infixes, and partly by suffixes. Unlike Chichewa, tones do not form any part of the distinction between one tense and another.

In the past a distinction is made between hodiernal tenses (referring to events of today) and remote tenses (referring to events of yesterday or some time ago). However, the boundary between recent and remote is not exact.

Another distinction is made between past and perfect tenses. When a perfect tense is used it carries an implication that the resulting situation still exists at the time of speaking, for example: 'the pumpkins have spread over the garden'. The present perfect can also be used in verbs expressing a current situation such as  'I am sitting' or  'I am pleased'. The remote perfect is used for events which happened some time ago but of which the effects still apply today, such as  'the rock has fallen' or  'he (has) died'.

The future tenses similarly distinguish near from remote events. Some tenses imply that the event will take place elsewhere, for example  'I will go and visit'.

Compound tenses are also found in Tumbuka, such as  'he had slept',  'he had just left' and  'he will have sold'.

Other future tenses are given by Vail (1972) and others.

In the 1st person singular, ni-ku- and ni-ka- are shortened to nkhu- and nkha-:  'I am going', 'I go',  'I used to go'.

Negative verbs
It seems that  is preferred by younger speakers:

'he is not writing a letter'

'we will not work tomorrow'

With the present perfect tense, however, a separate form exists, adding -nda- and ending in -e:
 
'yes, I have met him'

'no, I haven't met him'

The Ngoni influence on Tumbuka

Words of Ngoni (Zulu/Ndwandwe) origin found in Tumbuka:

All Tumbuka dialects have to some extent been affected by the Ngoni language, most especially in Mzimba District of Malawi. Ngoni is a language that originates from the Ndwandwe people who were neighbours to the Zulu clan prior to being conquered by the Zulu and being assimilated into the Zulu identity. The language the Ndwandwe spoke was thus nearly identical Zulu. Below are some examples of words found in chitumbuka that are of Zulu/Ndwandwe origin, though most of them have original Tumbuka counterpart words that can be used interchangeably at the speakers will, (excluding 'munwe/minwe' meaning 'finger/fingers' for example, that seemingly did not have an original counterpart or the original word has been lost).

An example of Tumbuka

Months in Tumbuka:

An example of a folktale translated into Tumbuka and other languages of Northern Malawi is given in the Language Mapping Survey for Northern Malawi carried out by the Centre for Language Studies of the University of Malawi. The Tumbuka version of the folktale goes as follows:

(Translation)
THE TORTOISE AND THE HARE
Tortoise went to beg food from people. To carry his bag, he tied it to a long string and wore it round his neck. As he walked along, the bag was coming behind him.

As he was on his way, Hare came up behind him and said, "There it is, my bag!" Tortoise said "The bag is mine, see this string I've tied now I'm pulling it as I go." Hare refused to accept this and said "Let's go the Court, so that it can judge us." The Court examined the case and cut Tortoise's string which he'd tied the bag with. They took that bag and gave it to Hare.

Another day when Hare was walking along, Tortoise found him and said, "There it is, my tail!" Hare said, "Nonsense, this is my tail, Tortoise." Tortoise refused to accept this and said, "What I've got is mine." They went to the Court so that it could make a judgement. In that Court, the case went in Tortoise's favour. They cut off Hare's tail and gave it to Tortoise.

Some vocabulary

Helpful phrases 
    =  Yes
    =  No
   =  Thank you
 = We are thankful
 = I want some food !
 = could you give me some food?
 = I do not speak chiTumbuka!
 = Travel well.
 = I would like water to drink.

Greetings 
 =  Good morning.  (How did you wake up?)
 =  Fine.  And you? (I woke up well.  I don't know about you?)
 = How are you?
 = I am fine, how are you?
  = Good afternoon. (How did you spend the day?)
 = Good afternoon.  How are you? (I spent the day well.  I don't know about you?)
 = somewhat more formal than "Hi". Perhaps best translated as "Greetings".
 = We shall meet again.

People 
The plural ba- (ŵa-) is often used for politeness when referring to elders:
 = boy
 = boys
 = girl
 = girls
 = young ladies
 = a woman with babies
 = mother
 = dad
 = grandmother
 = grandmother, also used when addressing old female persons
 = grandfather
 = paternal aunt
 = maternal aunt usually your mother's younger/older sister
 = maternal uncle
 = paternal uncle usually your father's younger/older brother
 = my brother/ sister (for addressing a sibling of the opposite sex)
 = my young brother / sister (for addressing a sibling of the same sex)
 = my elder brother / sister (for addressing a sibling of the same sex)

Verbs 
 = to play
 = to laugh
 = to eat
 = to sleep
 = to walk
 = to run
 = to write
 = to do laundry
 = to bath
 = to cook
 = to dig / cultivate
 = to plant
 = to dance
 = to sing

Animals        
 = tortoise
 = hare
 = hippo
 = hyena
 = snake
 = pig
 = cow
 = dog
 = cat
 = sheep
 = lion
 = goat
 = chicken

See also 
Tumbuka people
Tumbuka mythology

Notable Tumbuka People 

 Sheperd Bushiri (Christian preacher)
 Mwai Kumwenda (netball player)
 Briddget Kumwenda (netball player)
 Chakufwa Chihana ( human rights activist and politician)
 Enoch Chihana (member of parliament)

References

Bibliography

 Botne, Robert (1999). "Future and distal -ka-'s: Proto-Bantu or nascent form(s)?". In: Jean-Marie Hombert and Larry M. Hyman (eds.), Bantu Historical Linguistics: Theoretical and Empirical Perspectives. Stanford, CA: Center for the Study of Language and Information, pp. 473–515.
 Chase, Robert (2004). "A Comparison of Demonstratives in the Karonga and Henga Dialects of Tumbuka". Undergraduate paper. Amherst: Dept. of Linguistics, Univ. of Massachusetts.
 Chavula, Jean Josephine (2016). "Verbal derivation and valency in Chitumbuka". Leiden University doctoral thesis.
 Downing, Laura J. (2006). "The Prosody and Syntax of Focus in Chitumbuka". ZAS Papers in Linguistics 43, 55-79.
 Downing, Laura J. (2008). "Focus and prominence in Chichewa, Chitumbuka and Durban Zulu". ZAS Papers in Linguistics 49, 47-65.
 Downing, Laura J. (2012). "On the (Non-)congruence of Focus and Prominence in Tumbuka". Selected Proceedings of the 42nd Annual Conference on African Linguistics, ed. Michael R. Marlo et al., 122-133. Somerville, MA: Cascadilla Proceedings Project.
 Downing, Laura J. (2017). "Tone and intonation in Chichewa and Tumbuka". In Laura J. Downing & Annie Rialland (eds) Intonation in African Tone Languages. de Gruyter, Berlin/Boston, pp. 365–392.
 Downing, Laura J. (2019). "Tumbuka prosody: Between tone and stress".  In: Emily Clem et al (eds). Theory and Description in African Linguistics: Selected papers from the 47th Annual Conference on African Linguistics, 75-94. Also available online at: 
 Elmslie, Walter Angus (1923): Introductory Grammar of the Tumbuka Language. Livingstonia Mission Press.
 Kamwendo, Gregory H. (2004). Kamwendo "Your Chitumbuka is Shallow. It's not the Real Chitumbuka: Linguistic Purism Among Chitumbuka Speakers in Malawi", Nordic Journal of African Studies 13(3): 275–288.
 Kishindo, Pascal J. et Allan L. Lipenga (2006). Parlons citumbuka : langue et culture du Malawi et de la Zambie, L'Harmattan, Paris, Budapest, Kinshasa, 138 pages. 
 Kishindo, Pascal J. (ed), Jean J. Chavula and others (2018).  (Citumbuka dictionary). Centre for Language Studies, University of Malawi. 
 Kiso, Andrea (2012). "Tense and Aspect in Chichewa, Citumbuka, and Cisena". Ph.D. Thesis. Stockholm University.
 McNicholl, Duncan (2010). "The No-Nonsense Guide to Learning Chitumbuka: Volume 1".
 Moto, Francis (1999). "The Tonal Phonology of Bantu Ideophones". Malilime: Malawian Journal of Linguistics no.1, 100-120. (pp. 112–119 deals with tone in Chitumbuka ideophones).
 Mphande, L. (1989). "A Phonological Analysis of the Ideophone in Chitumbuka". Ph.D. Dissertation. The University of Texas, Austin.
 Shiozaki, Lisa (2004). "Concordial agreement in the Karonga dialect of Tumbuka". Undergraduate paper. Amherst: Dept. of Linguistics, Univ. of Massachusetts.
 Turner, W.M. (1952). Tumbuka–Tonga–English Dictionary The Hetherwick Press, Blantyre, Nyasaland (now Malawi).
 University of Malawi Centre for Language Studies (2006). "Language Mapping Survey for Northern Malawi".
 Vail, Hazen Leroy (1971). "The noun classes of Tumbuka". African studies, v. 30, 1, p. 35-59.
 Vail, Hazen Leroy (1972). "Aspects of the Tumbuka Verb". Ph.D. dissertation, University of Wisconsin.

External links 

Very brief report on Tumbuka language.
Language Mapping Survey for Northern Malawi. University of Malawi Centre for Language Studies, 2006.
Language Map of Northern Malawi
Some more chiTumbuka vocabulary.
PanAfrican L10n page on Tumbuka
Citumbuka monolingual dictionary

 
Nyasa languages
Languages of Malawi
Languages of Zambia
Tumbuka people
Non-tonal languages in tonal families
Tumbuka language (Mzimba dialect)